At the Crossing Places is the second book in the Arthur trilogy by Kevin Crossley-Holland. It is a children's historical fantasy and an Arthurian legend, and recounts the story of the squire Arthur de Caldicot in the year 1200 after the events of The Seeing Stone.

Historical fantasy novels
Novels by Kevin Crossley-Holland
2001 non-fiction books
Fiction set in the 1200s